2021 Abu Dhabi T10 was the fourth season of the Abu Dhabi T10. The matches had a 10-over-a-side format with a time duration of 90 minutes. The tournament was played as a round robin followed by semifinals and the final. It was originally scheduled to be played from 19 to 28 November 2020 at the Sheikh Zayed Cricket Stadium. The tournament started from 28 January with final held on 6 February 2021 due to the COVID-19 pandemic.

Karnataka Tuskers changed their name to Pune Devils.

Squads

Group stage

Group A

Group B

Super league

 Advanced to Qualifier Advanced to Eliminator 1

Playoffs

Qualifier

Eliminators
Eliminator 1

Eliminator 2

3rd place playoff

Final

References

External links
 Series home at ESPNCricinfo

T10 League
Abu Dhabi T10 League